The Moroccan worm lizard (Blanus mettetali) is a species of amphisbaenian in the family Blanidae. The species is endemic to Morocco.

Etymology
The specific name, mettetali, is in honor of a Mr. Mettetal who was head of the Laboratory of Animal Biology, Faculty of Sciences of Morocco.

Habitat
The natural habitats of B. mettetali are temperate forests, temperate shrubland, Mediterranean-type shrubby vegetation, arable land, and pastureland.

Conservation status
B. mettetali is threatened by habitat loss.

References

Further reading
Bons, Jacques (1963). "Notes sur Blanus cinereus (Vandelli), description d'une sous-espèce Marocaine: Blanus cinereus mettetali ssp. nov." Bulletin de la Société des Sciences naturelles et physiques du Maroc (1-2): 95–107. (in French).

Phylogeographical patterns
 

mettetali
Endemic fauna of Morocco
Reptiles described in 1963
Taxa named by Jacques Bons
Reptiles of North Africa
Taxonomy articles created by Polbot